Merley is a large housing estate in the unparished area of Poole, a mile (2 km) south of Wimborne Minster. Originally called Myrle, Merley was a manor in the tithing of Great Canford (or Canford Magna). The village merges with that of Oakley, and the housing estate was originally going to be called "Oakley Garden Village", note Oakley Shops and other signposts around the community but the name was changed. The housing estate only covers part of the area that was originally called Merley/Myrle. The Poole ward is Merley and Bearwood. The population of this ward taken at the 2011 census was 10,392.

Statistics
Merley is part of the greater ward called "Merley and Bearwood" and here are some statistics on this area:

People
 10,392 people live in Merley and Bearwood.
 There are about 4078 dwellings in the ward
 There are 2228 people over the age of 60 living in this ward
 52.54% of people over the age of 16 are currently married.

Housing
 88.99% of residents either own their homes outright or with a mortgage.
 5.27% of residents live in council or housing association homes.
 4.27% of residents live in privately rented homes.

Environment
 The population density of Merley and Bearwood is approximately 1673 people per square mile (646/km2).
 The actual size of the ward is 6.4 square miles (17 km2).

Employment
 The biggest industry in this area (with 16.62% of people) are the wholesale and retail trade motor mechanic industries.
 The biggest male industry in this area (with 21.86% of males) is the manufacturing industry.
 The biggest females industry in this area (with 21.84% of females) is the health and social work industry.

Source: First release of the 2001 Census data, released in September 2002.

History
The 1970s housing estate surrounding Sopwith Crescent was built over a period of several years from the Oakley Straight end on former farmland. It was originally called Oakley Garden Village by the developers, but soon became incorporated into the adjacent older village.

Education and schools
Merley First School serves Merley and Oakley and is one of the founding members of the Wimborne Academy Trust. The private Canford School is also located nearby at Canford Magna.

Sport and leisure

Merley has a Non-League football club Merley Cobham Sports F.C. who play at Cobham Sports and Social Club.

Politics 
Merley is part of the Bearwood and Merley ward, which elects 3 councillors to Bournemouth, Christchurch and Poole Council.

References

External links

Villages in Dorset
Areas of Poole